The girls' 200 metre backstroke event at the 2018 Summer Youth Olympics took place on 9 October at the Natatorium in Buenos Aires, Argentina.

Results

Heats
The heats were started at 11:13.

Final
The final was held at 18:40.

References

Swimming at the 2018 Summer Youth Olympics